Lieutenant-General Sir Peter Hudson  (14 September 1923 – 8 August 2000) was a British Army officer who served as Deputy Commander of UK Land Forces.

Early life
Hudson was educated at Wellingborough School and Jesus College, Cambridge.

Military career
Hudson was commissioned in to the Rifle Brigade in 1944. He took part in the response to the Mau Mau Uprising in Kenya in 1954 and the Malayan Emergency in the late 1950s and was made Commanding Officer of 3rd Bn Royal Green Jackets in 1966. He was appointed Commander of 39th Infantry Brigade in Northern Ireland in 1969 at just the time when the Troubles were escalating, Director of Army staff Duties in 1972 and Commander of Eastern District in 1973. He went on to be Chief of Staff for Allied Forces Northern Europe in 1975 and Deputy Commander-in-Chief UK Land Forces in 1977 before retiring in 1980.

Later life
In retirement he became Secretary-General of the Order of St John and Lieutenant of the Tower of London. He was also Deputy Lieutenant of Berkshire.

He is buried at St Peter and St Paul Churchyard at Yattendon in Berkshire.

Family
In 1949 he married Susan Anne Knollys; they had a daughter and adopted a son and a daughter.

References

 

|-
 

1923 births
2000 deaths
Burials in Berkshire
British Army lieutenant generals
Knights Commander of the Order of the Bath
Commanders of the Order of the British Empire
Deputy Lieutenants of Berkshire
People educated at Wellingborough School
Rifle Brigade officers
British military personnel of the Mau Mau Uprising
British Army personnel of the Malayan Emergency
People from Yattendon
British Army personnel of World War II
British military personnel of The Troubles (Northern Ireland)